This is a list of yearly Colonial Athletic Association football standings.

Colonial Athletic Association standings

References

Colonial Athletic Association
Standings